Miss Guyana Universe 2009 was held at National Cultural Center, Georgetown on 4 July 2009.

Jenel Cox was crowned Miss Guyana Universe 2009. She beat 14 other contestants to take the title.

Jenel Cox represented Guyana in the Miss Universe 2009 at Atlantis Paradise Island, in Nassau, Bahamas on 23 August 2009.

Schedule of Events 

 June 28 : Swimsuit competition at Castellani House
 July 2 : Question & Answer Segment, Live on NCN
 July 4 : Pageant Final

Results

Special awards

Contestants

Crossovers 
Contestants who previously competed at other beauty pageants:

Jenel Cox, Miss Guyana Universe, was previously Miss Guyana Talented Teen 2006 and 2nd runner-up at Guyana's Next Top Model. She had competed at Miss Universe 2009 in Nassau, The Bahamas but unplaced.
Lucria Rambalak, 2nd runner-up of Miss Guyana Universe, has finished 2nd runner-up at Miss Guyana India Worldwide 2009. She was appointed as Guyana's delegate to the Miss India Worldwide 2010 in Durban, South Africa.
Janella Lewis, 3rd runner-up of Miss Guyana Universe, had completed at Miss Caribbean World 2008 in the British Virgin Islands.
Ornella Ramcharan had completed at Miss Guyana India Worldwide 2011 but unplaced. 
Divya Sieudarsan has finished 2nd runner-up at Miss Guyana India Worldwide 2011. She was crowned Miss Guyana India Worldwide 2014 in Georgetown. She represented Guyana at Miss India Worldwide 2014 in Abu Dhabi, United Arab Emirates.

References

Beauty pageants in Guyana
2009 beauty pageants
2009 in Guyana